Mayer Kirshenblatt (1916–2009) was a Polish-born Canadian painter and author.

Biography
Kirshenblatt was born in Apt (Yiddish)/ Opatów (Polish) Poland. He left Poland in 1934 and settled in Toronto, Canada, where he ran a paint and wallpaper store for many years. In 2007, he and his daughter Barbara Kirshenblatt-Gimblett published They Called Me Mayer July: Painted Memories of a Jewish Childhood before the Holocaust (University of California Press in conjunction with the Judah L Magnes Museum). The book won the Canadian Jewish Book Award, J. I. Segal Book Award, and American Association of University Presses (AAUP) award for book design, and was a finalist in three categories for the National Jewish Book Award. An exhibition of his work, which opened at the Magnes Museum in 2007, will travel to The Jewish Museum (New York City), Jewish Historical Museum (Amsterdam), and Museum of the History of Polish Jews (Warsaw). The book and exhibition are the culmination of a forty-year collaboration between father and daughter. In 1967, Barbara began interviewing Mayer about his childhood. In 1990, at the urging of his wife, daughter, and son-in-law Max Gimblett, Mayer began to paint.

See also
Shalom Koboshvili

References
 Kirshenblatt, Mayer and Barbara Kirshenblatt-Gimblett. They Called Me Mayer July: Painted Memories of a Jewish Childhood in Poland Before the Holocaust. Berkeley: University of California Press, 2007.

External links
 Artist's blog

1916 births
2009 deaths
People from Opatów
Canadian people of Polish-Jewish descent
Jewish Canadian artists
Folk artists
Canadian memoirists
Jewish Canadian writers
20th-century memoirists
Polish emigrants to Canada